The Scent (lit. "Man Who Waits for Adultery"; also shortened to ) is a 2012 South Korean comedy-thriller film starring Park Hee-soon and Park Si-yeon.

Kang Seon-woo is a detective specializing in adultery cases. One day, he investigates the scene of an incident only to find two dead bodies. The only witness is Kim Soo-jin, the dead man's wife. Seon-woo inadvertently become a primary suspect and struggles to prove his innocence.

Plot
For the past two years, while on suspension for adultery with a police chief's wife, detective Kang Seon-woo (Park Hee-soon), has been running a private-eye agency specializing in adultery cases. He's also being sued for divorce by his wife, Hye-young (Cha Soo-yeon). A couple of days before resuming his old job, Seon-u accepts a case from a woman, Kim Soo-jin (Yoon Jae), who wears a particularly alluring perfume. She says her husband, casino billionaire Nam Yeong-gil (Jo Won-hee), is conducting an affair with another woman at a love hotel in Gapyeong, Gyeonggi Province, outside Seoul. Seon-woo checks into an adjoining room in the unmanned hotel and is met there by Soo-jin. Instead of immediately surprising the lovers, Soo-jin invites Seon-woo to a drink and seduces him. Seon-woo wakes up next to her dead body, and in the next room finds the husband also dead. The woman there says her name is also Kim Soo-jin (Park Si-yeon) and the dead man is her husband. Along with his idiot assistant, ex-con Gi-poong (Lee Kwang-soo), Seon-woo cleans the crime scenes and buries the bodies, realizing he's been framed for the double murder. Resuming his job at Jonggu Police Station, Seon-woo investigates the case along with two colleagues: the stubbornly procedural Seo (Kim Jung-tae), who dislikes him, and the easy-going Han Gil-ro (Joo Sang-wook), who admires him. Seon-woo has noticed that Soo-jin wears the same perfume as her dead namesake, and she admits she wanted a divorce from her husband, who used to beat her. Seon-woo questions the dead Soo-jin's boyfriend, gym trainer Lee Jin-guk (Kim Yun-seong), but the trail leads nowhere. As the terrier-like Seo comes up with more evidence that could eventually implicate Seon-woo in the murders, Seon-woo finds himself falling hard for Soo-jin and on a deadline to solve the mystery.

Cast
Park Hee-soon - Kang Seon-woo 
Park Si-yeon - Kim Soo-jin
Joo Sang-wook - Detective Han Gil-ro
Kim Jung-tae - Detective Seo 
Lee Han-wi - Chief detective Sa 
Lee Kwang-soo - Gi-poong 
Cha Soo-yeon - Hye-young 
Kim Yun-seong - Lee Jin-guk
Jo Won-hee - Nam Yeong-gil
Yoon Jae - the other Kim Soo-jin 
Kim Gyeong-ryong - Yangpyeong neighborhood association president
Jeong Hyeong-seok - chief inspector at tribunal
Shin Hyeon-tak - mud boy man
Lydia Park - chief inspector at tribunal
Jeon Soo-kyung - Chinese restaurant manageress
Jang Hang-jun - Chinese restaurant boss
Kim Jeong-hak - forensics officer

Production
About her radical nude scene, Park Si-yeon said, "When I first got the script, there was no exposure scene and I did not know that I had to go naked in front of the camera until we started filming. It was tough as I have never done such thing before, but I had several heated discussions with the producer and my co-star Park Hee-soon about these scenes and we did it."

Box office
Despite somewhat negative reception from film critics, the film performed strongly at the box office. In total the film sold 1,246,185 admissions nationwide, with the success of the film largely attributed to Park Si-yeon's numerous nude scenes.

References

External links 
  
 
 
 

2012 films
2010s comedy thriller films
South Korean crime comedy films
South Korean comedy thriller films
2010s crime comedy films
Showbox films
2010s Korean-language films
2012 comedy films
2010s South Korean films